Blekinge (old ) is one of the traditional Swedish provinces, situated  in the southern coast of the geographic region of Götaland, in southern Sweden. It borders Småland, Scania and the Baltic Sea. It is the country's second-smallest province by area (only Öland is smaller), and the smallest province located on the mainland.

The name "Blekinge" comes from the dialectal adjective , which corresponds to the nautical term for "dead calm".

Administration 
The historical provinces of Sweden serve no administrative function. However, Blekinge is the only province, besides Gotland, which covers exactly the same area as the administrative county, which is Blekinge County.

Blekinge was granted its current arms  in 1660 at the time of the funeral of King Charles X Gustav of Sweden (1622–1660) based on a seal from the 15th century. Symbolically the three crowns from the Coat of arms of Sweden had been placed on the trunk of the tree to mark the change in status of the former Danish province, that now belonged to Sweden. The arms is represented with a ducal coronet. Blazon: "Azure, an Oak Tree eradicated Or ensigned with three Crowns palewise of the same."

Geography 
Relative to the rest of Sweden Blekinge has warm summers and mild winters.
Blekinge has a scenic archipelago and is sometimes called "Sweden's garden".

The nature of Blekinge is characterized by its oak forests with occasional hazel and common hornbeam. The relief is an uneven joint valley terrain with straight and narrow valley bottoms that widen towards the coast. Bedrock in Blekinge is mostly granite and gneiss of the Blekinge-Bornholm rock province.

History
Evidence of human habitation in western Blekinge dates circa 9700 BC in the Vesan area. At this time, Vesan was a small island surrounded by open grassland. A later settlement in the nearby Ljungaviken is dated to 6500 BC and contains the remains of at least 50 wooden houses and a buried dog.

Blekinge became part of the kingdom of Denmark at some point in the early 11th century – most likely 1026. Its status before then is unknown. It then remained a Danish province for over 600 years, and together with the provinces of Skåne and Halland, it made up Skåneland. The eastern part of the Danish kingdom where Scanian Law (Skånske Lov) prevailed. As a border province, Blekinge was often raided and looted by Swedish troops during Danish–Swedish wars. In 1658, it was ceded to Sweden according to the Treaty of Roskilde and has remained Swedish ever since.

During the Danish era, the port town of Sölvesborg was the seat of the administration in the western part of the province and Kristianopel in the eastern part. Notable  fortifications during this period included sites at  Elleholm, Sölvesborg, Lyckeby and Avaskär. Towns in Blekinge with city privileges were: Ronneby (1387), Sölvesborg (1445), Elleholm and Kristianopel. After the Swedish takeover two new towns, Karlshamn (chartered in 1664) and Karlskrona (1680), were built, and the populations of Ronneby and Kristianopel were forcibly relocated to them. Karlskrona has for more than 300 years been the principal naval base in Sweden.

Subdivisions 
Hundreds (in Götaland incl. Blekinge called härad in Swedish, in Svealand called hundare) were the historical subdivisions of a Swedish province. Blekinge's hundreds were Bräkne Hundred, Eastern Hundred, Lister Hundred, and Medelstad Hundred.

Language 
In Blekinge the dialect was historically closely related to Danish and eastern Scanian, which is most likely an effect of the former administrative links to Scania. 
Today, the dialect is not as significant as before, with the exception of Listerlandet with its special language. The eastern dialect of Danish can also be found on the Danish island of Bornholm.

Sports
Football in the province is administered by Blekinge Fotbollförbund.

See also
 Blekinge Institute of Technology
 Blekinge archipelago

References

External links

 Blekinge—Official tourist site

 
Provinces of Sweden